The 1999 NCAA Division I men's basketball tournament involved 64 schools playing in single-elimination play to determine the national champion of men's  NCAA Division I college basketball. It began on March 11, 1999, and ended with the championship game on March 29 at Tropicana Field in St. Petersburg, Florida. A total of 63 games were played. This Final Four was the first—and so far, only—to be held in a baseball-specific facility, as Tropicana Field is home to the Tampa Bay Rays (then known as the Devil Rays).

The Final Four consisted of Connecticut, making their first ever Final Four appearance; Ohio State, making their ninth Final Four appearance and first since 1968; Michigan State, making their third Final Four appearance and first since their 1979 national championship; and Duke, the overall number one seed and making their first Final Four appearance since losing the national championship game in 1994.

In the national championship game, Connecticut defeated Duke 77–74 to win their first ever national championship, snapping Duke's 32-game winning streak, and scoring the biggest point-spread upset in Championship Game history. Duke nonetheless tied the record for most games won during a single season, with 37, which they co-held until Kentucky's 38-win seasons in 2011–12 and 2014–15. The 2007–08 Memphis team actually broke this record first, but the team was later forced to vacate their entire season due to eligibility issues surrounding the team.

Richard "Rip" Hamilton of Connecticut was named the tournament's Most Outstanding Player. This was a significant victory for the program, as it cemented Connecticut's reputation as a true basketball power after a decade of barely missing the Final Four.

This tournament is also historically notable as the coming-out party for Gonzaga as a rising mid-major power. Gonzaga has made every NCAA tournament since then, and is now generally considered to be a high-major program despite its mid-major conference affiliation.

Due to violations committed by Ohio State head coach Jim O'Brien, the Buckeyes were forced to vacate their appearance in the 1999 Final Four.

Schedule and venues

The following are the sites that were selected to host each round of the 1999 tournament:

First and Second Rounds
 March 11 and 13
 South Region
 RCA Dome, Indianapolis, Indiana (Hosts: Butler University, Midwestern Collegiate Conference)
 Orlando Arena, Orlando, Florida (Host: Stetson University)
 West Region
 McNichols Sports Arena, Denver, Colorado (Hosts: Western Athletic Conference, Colorado State University)
 KeyArena, Seattle, Washington (Host: University of Washington)
 March 12 and 14
 East Region
 FleetCenter, Boston, Massachusetts (Host: Boston College)
 Charlotte Coliseum, Charlotte, North Carolina (Host: University of North Carolina at Charlotte)
 Midwest Region
 Bradley Center, Milwaukee, Wisconsin (Host: Marquette University)
 Louisiana Superdome, New Orleans, Louisiana (Host: Tulane University)
Regional semifinals and finals (Sweet Sixteen and Elite Eight)
 March 18 and 20
 South Regional, Thompson–Boling Arena, Knoxville, Tennessee (Host: University of Tennessee)
 West Regional, America West Arena, Phoenix, Arizona (Host: Arizona State University)
 March 19 and 21
 East Regional, Continental Airlines Arena, East Rutherford, New Jersey (Hosts: Seton Hall University, Big East Conference)
 Midwest Regional, Trans World Dome, St. Louis, Missouri (Host: Missouri Valley Conference)

National semifinals and championship (Final Four and championship)
 March 27 and 29
 Tropicana Field, St. Petersburg, Florida (Hosts: University of South Florida, Conference USA)

St. Petersburg became the 27th host city, and Tropicana Field the 32nd host venue, for the Final Four. Tropicana Field, the home of baseball's Tampa Bay Rays, was the sixth different domed stadium to host a Final Four, and the only one designed specifically for baseball; given its inability to be converted to a center court arena, it is unlikely to host one again. There were four new venues in the 1999 tournament, two in completely new host cities for the tournament. For the first time, the tournament came to Boston at the FleetCenter, which had replaced the Boston Garden in 1995. Despite the original Garden's rich college and NBA history, it never had hosted any NCAA tournament games. The tournament also came to downtown Phoenix for the first time, at the NBA home of the Phoenix Suns. Previous games in the metropolitan area were played in suburban Tempe at Arizona State University. For the second straight year, the Midwest Regional games were held in a new venue in St. Louis, this time at the Trans World Dome, then home to the NFL's St. Louis Rams. The tournament also returned to Seattle, this time at KeyArena, the downtown home to the Seattle SuperSonics. This tournament would be the last held at McNichols Sports Arena, which was scheduled to close later in the year and is now the site of parking for Empower Field at Mile High; subsequent games in Denver have moved to the Ball Arena. It is also the last tournament to date to include Tropicana Field and Thompson–Boling Arena, as neither has hosted since. Any future tournament games to be held in Tampa would be played at the Amalie Arena.

Teams

Bids by conference

Bracket
* Denotes overtime period

East Regional – East Rutherford, New Jersey

Regional Final summary

Midwest Regional – St. Louis, Missouri

Regional Final summary

South Regional – Knoxville, Tennessee

Regional Final summary

West Regional – Phoenix, Arizona

Game summaries

First Round

Second Round

Regional Semifinals

Regional Final

Final Four

St. Petersburg, Florida

Game summaries

Final four

National Championship

Media coverage

Television
CBS Sports

Studio host

Studio analysts

Commentary teams
 Jim Nantz/Billy Packer/Bonnie Bernstein First & Second Round at New Orleans, Louisiana; Midwest Regional at St. Louis; Final Four at St. Petersburg, Florida
 Sean McDonough and Bill Raftery First & Second Round at Indianapolis, Indiana; South Regional at Knoxville, Tennessee
 Verne Lundquist/Al McGuire/Armen Keteyian First & Second Round at Charlotte, North Carolina; East Regional at East Rutherford, New Jersey
 Gus Johnson/Dan Bonner/Barry Booker First & Second Round at Orlando, Florida; West Regional at Phoenix, Arizona
 Tim Brando/James Worthy/Beth Mowins First & Second Round at Milwaukee, Wisconsin
 Kevin Harlan/Jon Sundvold/Mike Harris First & Second Round at Seattle, Washington
 Ian Eagle and Jim Spanarkel First & Second Round at Denver, Colorado
 Craig Bolerjack and Rolando Blackman First & Second Round at Boston, Massachusetts

Radio
Westwood One

First and Second Rounds
 – East Region First and Second Rounds at Charlotte, North Carolina
 – East Region First and Second Rounds at Boston, Massachusetts
 – Midwest Region First and Second Rounds at Milwaukee, Wisconsin
 – Midwest Region First and Second Rounds at New Orleans, Louisiana
 – South Region First and Second Rounds at Indianapolis, Indiana
 – South Region First and Second Rounds at Orlando, Florida
 – West Region First and Second Rounds at Denver, Colorado
 – West Region First and Second Rounds at Seattle, Washington

Regionals
 – East Regional at East Rutherford, New Jersey
 – Midwest Regional at St. Louis, Missouri
 – South Regional at Knoxville, Tennessee
 – West Regional at Phoenix, Arizona

Final Four and National Championship
 Marty Brennaman and Ron Franklin – (Connecticut–Ohio State) Final Four at St. Petersburg, Florida
 John Rooney and Bill Raftery – (Duke–Michigan State) Final Four and National Championship Game at St. Petersburg, Florida

Local Radio

Additional notes
 Despite their loss in the finals to Connecticut, the 1998–1999 Duke team won 37 games.  This tied them with Duke's 1985–86 team, UNLV's 1986–87 squad, and later, Illinois' 2004–05 team and Kansas's 2007–08 team, for the most wins in a season, until their record was broken by the 38-win Memphis team in 2007–08.  However, as the NCAA vacated Memphis' 2007–2008 season due to the ineligibility of Derrick Rose, they reclaimed the 37-win record. The mark would once again be raised to 38 wins after Kentucky's dominant title run in 2012, which then tied with Kentucky's 2014–15 team.  Only one of the first 5 teams to be the winningest single-season teams won a national championship; UNLV's squad lost in the national semifinal to Indiana, and the other teams lost in the finals, to Louisville, UConn, and North Carolina, while Kansas defeated Memphis in the 2008 national championship game.  Kentucky's 2014–15 squad suffered their only loss that season in the national semifinal to Wisconsin.
 Connecticut's victory in the finals marks the biggest upset in Championship Game history in the NCAA tournament, as they were 9.5-point underdogs in the contest despite having compiled a 33–2 record going into the Championship game, including a 14–2 record in the tough Big East Conference.  In fact, Connecticut had spent more weeks as the number 1 team in the country, according to the AP Top 25 Poll, than had Duke. The previous record was held by Villanova, who defeated Georgetown as 9-point underdogs in 1985.
 The 1999 Final Four would be the last time Tropicana Field would host NCAA tournament games. For Duke, they had 2 straight promising seasons end on the Tropicana Field floor, with an 86–84 loss to Kentucky in the 1998 South Regional final, and then the 1999 National Championship game.
 North Carolina lost to Weber State which marked the first time the Tar Heels had lost in the first round of the expanded field era with 64 or more teams.
 This is the only tournament in which all four 7-seeds lost in the first round to their 10-seeded opponents.

Notes

See also
 1999 NCAA Division II men's basketball tournament
 1999 NCAA Division III men's basketball tournament
 1999 NCAA Division I women's basketball tournament
 1999 NCAA Division II women's basketball tournament
 1999 NCAA Division III women's basketball tournament
 1999 National Invitation Tournament
 1999 Women's National Invitation Tournament
 1999 NAIA Division I men's basketball tournament
 1999 NAIA Division II men's basketball tournament
 1999 NAIA Division I women's basketball tournament
 1999 NAIA Division II women's basketball tournament

NCAA Division I men's basketball tournament
Ncaa
Sports competitions in St. Petersburg, Florida
NCAA Division I men's basketball tournament
NCAA Division I men's basketball tournament
Basketball competitions in Florida